The Heavy is a 2010 thriller film directed by Marcus Warren and stars Vinnie Jones, Gary Stretch, Shannyn Sossamon and Christopher Lee. It also features the screen debut of Blue member Lee Ryan.

Plot
The film is about rivalry and betrayal between two brothers. One is a candidate for Prime Minister and the other is a henchman for a businessman. When one is given the opportunity to take revenge against the other, he must come to terms with the truth and face a world where trust doesn't exist and loyalty is rare.

Cast

Release
The film was released on 16 April 2010 direct to DVD in the United States and received a limited theatrical release in the UK on the same day.  The film was dedicated to the memory of producer John Daly.

Soundtrack
The score was composed by British Trance DJ Paul Oakenfold.

References

External links
 

2010 films
2010 psychological thriller films
American psychological thriller films
British psychological thriller films
Films shot in England
2010s English-language films
2010s American films
2010s British films